Carlos Andrés Rodríguez Hernández (born 2 June 1996) is a Colombian professional footballer who plays as a midfielder for Categoría Primera A side Patriotas.

Career
Rodríguez was moved into Categoría Primera A side Patriotas' senior squad in 2016, at the beginning of the 2016 campaign. On 2 April, Rodríguez made his professional debut during a loss away to Santa Fe. In his third appearance in all competitions, he scored the first two goals of his career in a 3–3 Copa Colombia tie against Boyacá Chicó. After two seasons with the first-team, Rodríguez featured forty-two times and netted seven goals; all of which came in Copa Colombia matches.

Career statistics
.

References

External links

1996 births
Living people
Place of birth missing (living people)
Colombian footballers
Association football midfielders
Categoría Primera A players
Patriotas Boyacá footballers